Josh Campbell (born 6 May 2000) is a Scottish professional footballer who plays for Scottish Premiership club Hibernian as a midfielder. Campbell has previously played for Airdrieonians, Arbroath and Edinburgh City, and represented Scotland once at under-21 level.

Club career
Born in Edinburgh, Campbell came through the youth system at Hibernian. He was loaned to Airdrieonians in January 2019, and made his first team debut for Hibs in a League Cup match against Stirling Albion in July 2019. He was loaned to Arbroath in August 2019.

In September 2020, Campbell was loaned to Edinburgh City. He helped them progress to the promotion play-off final with goals in both legs of the semi-final against Elgin City. Campbell ended his loan spell with Edinburgh City having scored nine goals in thirty games.

Following his return from his loan spell at Edinburgh City, Campbell came off the bench for Hibernian in their first leg of the UEFA Europa Conference League qualifiers against Andorran side FC Santa Coloma, in the second leg of the qualifying round Campbell played the full game for Hibernian in their 2–1 away win. Three days later Campbell made his league debut for Hibernian as he came off the bench in the club's 3–2 victory against Motherwell.

On 1 December 2021, Campbell signed a new long-term contract with Hibernian, running until 2025. Campbell scored his first goal for Hibernian in a 1–1 draw against St Mirren on 11 December 2021.

Campbell scored a hat-trick in a 6–0 win against Aberdeen on 28 January 2023. Speaking afterwards, Campbell said that it was the first time he had done that at any level since he played as a forward at school. He signed a new contract with Hibs in February 2023, with it due to run until the end of the 2026–27 season.

International career
He was selected in the Scotland under-21 squad in March 2022.

Career statistics

References

2000 births
Living people
Footballers from Edinburgh
Scottish footballers
Hibernian F.C. players
Airdrieonians F.C. players
Arbroath F.C. players
Scottish Professional Football League players
Association football midfielders
F.C. Edinburgh players
Scotland under-21 international footballers